Luka Merdović (Cyrillic: Лукa Mepдoвић, born 14 March 1989) is a Montenegrin football forward.

Club career
He had played with Montenegrin clubs FK Budućnost Podgorica, FK Mornar, FK Mladost Podgorica and FK Sutjeska Nikšić before moving to OFK Beograd where he played the first half of the 2010-11 Serbian SuperLiga season. During the winter break he returned to Mladost to play in the Montenegrin First League.

In 2017 he played for Greek side Agrotikos Asteras.

Honours
Lovćen
Montenegrin Cup: 2014

References

External sources
 Profile at Srbijafudbal

1989 births
Living people
Footballers from Podgorica
Association football forwards
Montenegrin footballers
FK Budućnost Podgorica players
FK Mornar players
OFK Titograd players
FK Sutjeska Nikšić players
OFK Beograd players
OFK Grbalj players
FK Lovćen players
FK Metalac Gornji Milanovac players
FK Radnik Surdulica players
Agrotikos Asteras F.C. players
ACS Foresta Suceava players
Montenegrin First League players
Serbian SuperLiga players
Serbian First League players
Football League (Greece) players
Liga III players
Montenegrin expatriate footballers
Expatriate footballers in Serbia
Montenegrin expatriate sportspeople in Serbia
Expatriate footballers in Greece
Montenegrin expatriate sportspeople in Greece
Expatriate footballers in Romania
Montenegrin expatriate sportspeople in Romania